EFCC may refer to:

 Economic and Financial Crimes Commission, a Nigerian law enforcement agency 
 Evangelical Free Church of Canada, a Canadian evangelical denomination
 Evangelical Free Church of China, a Hong Kong evangelical denomination, formerly active in mainland China
 Evangelical Fellowship of Congregational Churches, a British evangelical denomination
 Ellis Fischel Cancer Center, Columbia, Missouri, U.S.
 European Federation of Clinical Chemistry and Laboratory Medicine (EFLM, formerly EFCC)

See also
EFCC1, EF-hand and coiled-coil domain containing 1, a humans gene
Ministry of Environment, Forest and Climate Change (MoEFCC), is an Indian government ministry